Clarendon is an urbanized, upper-class neighborhood in Arlington County, Virginia, located between the Rosslyn area and the Ballston area.  It was named after Edward Hyde, 1st Earl of Clarendon, a leading statesman and historian of the English Civil War.  The main thoroughfares are Wilson Boulevard (one-way westbound) and Clarendon Boulevard (one-way eastbound).

Boundaries and geography
Because of the local street network configuration, many of Clarendon's 40-45 blocks resemble triangles rather than squares. The precise dimensions of Clarendon are not defined, and several different sets of boundaries are often used.  These include:

 Arlington County's Clarendon sector plan area (bounded roughly by Cleveland Street, 11th Street, Kirkwood Street, 13th Street, Highland Street and Wilson Boulevard)
 The boundaries of the civic associations comprising the Clarendon Alliance association including Ashton Heights, Clarendon-Courthouse, Lyon Park, and Lyon Village, and bounded by Lee Highway, Veitch Street, Wilson Boulevard, Arlington Boulevard, Glebe Road, Wilson Boulevard, and Kirkwood Street)
 The area unsuccessfully proposed to have been incorporated as a city in the 1930s
 The boundaries of the Clarendon-Courthouse Civic Association (Wilson Boulevard, N. Courthouse Road, Arlington Boulevard, and N. 10th Street)

The central geographic/cultural/economic features of Clarendon are the Clarendon Metro station (on the Orange and Silver lines of the Metrorail system at Wilson Boulevard and Highland Street), Market Common Clarendon and the Whole Foods Market at Clarendon Boulevard and Edgewood Street. As Clarendon's profile both as a popular destination and marketing location have increased, its informal boundaries have expanded west toward Virginia Square and east toward Courthouse, two adjacent Metro station areas.

History
First platted in 1900 at the top of a hill on the Georgetown-Falls Church Road (now Wilson Boulevard), Clarendon evolved into Arlington County's original "downtown" after the arrival of electric trolleys in 1896.  During the early 20th century, two interurban trolley lines converged in Clarendon a short distance west of today's Clarendon Metro station (see Northern Virginia trolleys).

One of these trolley lines traveled between Rosslyn and Clarendon along the present routes of Lynn Street, Fairfax Drive and Clarendon Boulevard to a station at the present intersection of Clarendon Boulevard and Washington Boulevard. Metrorail's Orange Line now closely follows this line's former route.

The other line traveled from downtown Washington, crossed the Potomac River over the Highway Bridge and traveled along Washington Boulevard to reach the Clarendon station. Trolleys from both lines traveled between Clarendon, Ballston and Falls Church along the present routes of Fairfax Drive, I-66 and the Orange Line. Some of these trolleys traveled as far as the towns of Vienna and Fairfax. Like many other interurbans around the country, these lines were to remain in service until the mid-1930s, when they succumbed to the automobile and Depression-era economics.

The village of Clarendon was named and dedicated March 31, 1900. In 1920, the same year in which Arlington County adopted its name, a movement to incorporate Clarendon as a town was defeated in the courts.

Over time, Clarendon became Northern Virginia's retail center.  Department stores including J.C. Penney and Sears opened stores in Clarendon, and other retailers extended west along Wilson Blvd and Fairfax Drive to Virginia Square (anchored by Kann's Department Store) and, farther west, the Parkington Shopping Center anchored by the Hecht Company, which was later enlarged and renamed as the Ballston Common Mall.

Built in 1937, the Arlington Post Office is the first known federal building constructed in the county after the American Civil War that is not within a larger federally-owned property. Previously Arlington's mail was handled in Washington, D.C.  Lobby murals depicting scenes about Arlington history were painted by Auriel Bessemer in 1939.  In 2000, it was named in honor of Joseph L. Fisher, former U.S. representative from Virginia's 10th district.  The building is a designated Arlington County landmark and is listed on the National Register of Historic Places.

By early 1975, two Vietnamese grocery stores had been opened in Clarendon, and in ensuing years Clarendon came to be known as "Little Saigon". Many Vietnamese refugees immigrated to Washington D.C., and Arlington, due to the proximity to the nation's capital, and existing social, family, and business connections. This neighborhood was home to commercial uses of Vietnamese grocery stores, restaurants, department stores, cafes, and entertainment to serve the large Vietnamese population. Business was attractive to Vietnamese immigrants in this neighborhood due to the depressed rents during the time of construction of the WMATA Clarendon metro station. Vietnamese restaurants adjacent to Clarendon Metro like Queen Bee, and Cafe Dalat, closed in the end of 2005 and Little Viet Garden closed at the end of 2008. Nam Viet is the only restaurant that remains in 2021.

After the opening of the Clarendon Metro station in December 1979, luxury apartments, office buildings and upscale chain stores have been constructed and gentrified the area, although some of the original businesses remain.  The former Sears store's parking lot and automotive department, briefly considered as a site for a Home Depot, was developed as a mixed residential/commercial project that now includes townhouses, luxury apartments, and national chain retail stores.

At least a half dozen restaurants closed in 2016.

Clarendon today

Clarendon is also host to several local and County-wide events each year, including Arlington's Neighborhood Day parade (held the second Saturday in May), the Mardi Gras parade and Tax Blues Night. The largest annual event, "Clarendon Day," is held on a Saturday in mid-October and features four live music stages, local restaurant and coffee house booths, clothing, jewelry, antiques and collectibles sales, children's games and rides, an ice-cream eating contest and other local traditions. Additionally, each spring Clarendon is host to the Clarendon Cup, part of the Armed Forces Cycling Classic, one of the largest one-day professional and amateur bicycle races in the U.S.

Before the COVID-19 pandemic, a farmers market at Clarendon's Central Park was held on Wednesday afternoons from spring through mid-December and featured organic produce, baked goods, plants and herbs, homemade soaps and other items for sale.

References

External links
 Clarendon Metro Station Area Data, Statistics and Development
Arlington's Urban Villages - Clarendon
Clarendon Alliance
Clarendon Sector Plan
Why is it Named Clarendon? And, What Does it Mean? - Ghosts of DC blog
 Clarendon, Arlington, Virginia is at coordinates 

1900 establishments in Virginia
Neighborhoods in Arlington County, Virginia
Populated places established in 1900
Transit-oriented developments in the United States